Floating bladderwort may be a common name for:

Utricularia gibba, floating bladderwort
Utricularia inflata, large floating bladderwort
Utricularia radiata, little floating bladderwort

Utricularia species by common name